Calf Hey Reservoir is a reservoir in Haslingden Grane, close to the town of Haslingden, in the Borough of Rossendale, England. It was the first of three reservoirs in the valley, the others being Ogden Reservoir and Holden Wood Reservoir.

Not to be confused with the upper of the two Ogden Reservoirs 11 miles to the north, near Nelson.

References 

Drinking water reservoirs in England
Reservoirs in Lancashire
Geography of the Borough of Rossendale